Scary Monsters (and Super Creeps), also known simply as Scary Monsters, is the 14th studio album by English musician David Bowie, released on 12 September 1980 through RCA Records. Over the previous three years, Bowie had garnered massive artistic success with the "Berlin Trilogy", which consisted of Low, "Heroes" and Lodger (1977–1979). However, the trilogy had proven less successful commercially. By 1980, numerous artists Bowie had inspired with the trilogy were out-performing him commercially, leading him to desire a more commercial sound for his next record.

Co-produced by Tony Visconti, the album was recorded between February and April 1980. Sessions primarily took place at the Power Station in New York City, with additional recording undergone at Good Earth Studios in London. Much of the same personnel from prior releases returned for the sessions, with additional guitar work done by Chuck Hammer and Robert Fripp, and a guest appearance by guitarist Pete Townshend. The music incorporates elements of art rock, new wave and post-punk. Unlike the improvisational nature of prior releases, Bowie spent time writing the music and lyrics; several were recorded under working titles throughout the sessions while some of the tracks contained reworked elements of earlier, unreleased songs. The album cover is a large-scale collage that features Bowie donning a Pierrot costume, along with references to his prior releases on the rear sleeve.

The album's lead single, "Ashes to Ashes", revisited the character of Major Tom from "Space Oddity" and was promoted with an inventive music video. Upon release, Scary Monsters garnered critical and commercial acclaim; it peaked at No. 1 in the UK while restoring Bowie's commercial standing in the US, peaking at No. 12. Scary Monsters would later be referred to by commentators as Bowie's "last great album" and a benchmark for subsequent releases. It was Bowie's final studio album for RCA and marked the final collaboration between Bowie and Visconti for over 20 years. Several publications have considered it one of the greatest albums of all time. The album has been reissued multiple times, and was remastered in 2017 as part of the A New Career in a New Town (1977–1982) box set.

Background 
From 1976 to 1979, David Bowie recorded what became known as the "Berlin Trilogy", which consisted of Low, "Heroes" (both 1977) and Lodger (1979). Made in collaboration with musician Brian Eno and producer Tony Visconti, the trilogy was highly influential. Low was seen as a precursor to post-rock and post-punk, influencing artists such as Joy Division and the Human League, while Lodgers use of world music is credited for inspiring artists such as Talking Heads and Paul Simon.

Though considered artistically significant, the trilogy had proven less successful commercially. Lodgers commercial performance was hindered by artists who were influenced by the earlier Berlin releases, such as Gary Numan. Numan, a huge fan of Bowie's, was disparaged by Bowie's fanbase as a mere copycat. Bowie himself criticised Numan, which led to a long-running feud between the two artists. According to biographer David Buckley, Numan's fame indirectly led to Bowie taking a more commercial direction for his next record.

Recording and production 

In February 1980, Bowie travelled to the Power Station in New York City to begin recording his next album. Returning from the "Berlin Trilogy" was Visconti, who was immediately told by Bowie that this was going to be a more commercial record than his previous releases. Eno did not return, having ended his collaboration with Bowie after Lodger, stating he felt the "Berlin Trilogy" had "petered out" by that record. The core lineup of Dennis Davis, Carlos Alomar and George Murray returned for the sessions; this would be the fifth and final Bowie album to feature this lineup, who had been together since Station to Station (1976). Only Alomar would continue working with Bowie hereafter. Adrian Belew, who played on Lodger, told Buckley he received advanced payment to play on the sessions and was surprised to find the record made without him. In lieu of Belew, King Crimson guitarist Robert Fripp, who played on "Heroes", was brought back, along with newcomer Chuck Hammer, whom Bowie hired after hearing him play with Lou Reed in London the year before. According to NME editors Roy Carr and Charles Shaar Murray, Hammer added multiple textural layers deploying guitar synth and Fripp brought back the same distinctive sound he lent "Heroes". Returning from the Station to Station sessions was pianist Roy Bittan, who was recording Bruce Springsteen's The River (1980) concurrently in the same studio.

Initial sessions at the Power Station took place over two and a half weeks, with an additional week used for overdubs. During this time, only "It's No Game (No. 2)" was completed in its entirety. The remaining tracks were solely instrumental. During the sessions, Alomar suggested recording a cover of Tom Verlaine's "Kingdom Come". Bowie felt the track was the standout on Verlaine's 1979 eponymous solo album, stating "It just happens to fit into the scattered scheme of things". Bowie asked Verlaine to play lead guitar on the track. Verlaine accepted, but upon his arrival at the studio, he tried out numerous guitar amps in order to "get the right sound" while Bowie and Visconti left him alone. Visconti recalled, "I don't think we ever used a note of his playing, if we even recorded him." Instead, Fripp ended up playing lead guitar. Recorded during these sessions was an instrumental titled "Crystal Japan"; it was originally intended to be the album's closing track, but was dropped in favour of a reprise of "It's No Game". It was instead released as a single in Japan, making its first appearance in a 1980 Japanese television commercial for the Shōchū drink Crystal Jun Rock.

Instead of improvising lyrics and music as he had with prior releases, Bowie informed Visconti he wanted to take time composing and developing the lyrics and melodies; Visconti recalled, "Instead of immediately writing finished melodies and lyrics, David begged to take a long break to think it all out, so we adjourned until two months later in London." Buckley writes that what Bowie presented Visconti were "some of the most innovative melodies of his career." According to biographer Nicholas Pegg, some of the handwritten lyrics were included in the 2013 David Bowie Is exhibition. Many of the tracks had working titles early on. In a cassette dated March 1980 in Visconti's archive, some of the tracks included "People Are Turning to Gold" (later "Ashes to Ashes"), "It Happens Everyday" (later "Teenage Wildlife") and "Jamaica" (became "Fashion" late in the album's development). At this point in the album's development, "Up the Hill Backwards" was known as "Cameras in Brooklyn" and "Scream Like a Baby" as "I Am a Laser", originally written in 1973 and recorded by the Astronettes (made up of Bowie collaborators Ava Cherry and Geoff MacCormack) at Olympic Studios the same year. Pegg writes that there was a track called "Is There Life After Marriage?" that was recorded and left unfinished during the sessions. An instrumental cover of "I Feel Free" by Cream was also recorded and left unfinished, although it was brought back for 1993's Black Tie White Noise. According to Pegg, the lyrics for the title track were written in response to a promotional campaign for Kellogg's Corn flakes cereal, which offered novelty toys of "Scary Monsters and Super Heroes".

The sessions resumed in April 1980 at Good Earth Studios in London, Visconti's own studio at the time. Here, all vocals were recorded, including the Japanese narration provided by actress Michi Hirota for "It's No Game (No. 1)". Additional instrumental overdubs were provided by Fripp and keyboardist Andy Clark, along with a guest appearance by the Who guitarist Pete Townshend on "Because You're Young". Townshend, who was dealing with numerous personal issues at the time, arrived at the studio in a bad mood; when Townshend asked Bowie and Visconti what they wanted from him, they replied "Pete Townshend chords". His contributions were ultimately placed low in the mix.

Music and lyrics 

Commentators have classified Scary Monsters as art rock, new wave, and post-punk. Writing for AllMusic, Stephen Thomas Erlewine considers Scary Monsters to be a culmination of Bowie's 1970s works. He also considers the record's sound to be not "far removed from the post-punk of the early '80s". Pegg agrees, describing the record as "the triumphant culmination of Bowie's steely art-rock phase and a crucial doorway into early 1980s British pop." In a career retrospective, Consequence of Sound described Scary Monsters as "a high watermark of art pop by which Bowie's future releases are still compared." Bowie himself considered the record's sound to be "the epitome of the new wave sound at the time." Carr and Murray describe the album's sound as being harsher – and his worldview more desperate – than anything he had released since Diamond Dogs (1974). Biographer Christopher Sandford writes that lyrically, Scary Monsters reaffirms themes that Bowie had explored throughout his career up to that point, including madness, alienation and the "redeeming power of love"; in this case however, Bowie is able to bring the listener in instead of "freezing [them] out".

Side one 

The album opens with "It's No Game (No. 1)", which features sinister guitar loops and Bowie's screaming vocal performance, which Chris O'Leary cites as reminiscent of John Lennon's performance on Plastic Ono Band (1970). Partly taken from an older tune titled "Tired of My Life", it features lyrics read by Japanese actress Michi Hirota, which were translated by Hisahi Miura. Hirota delivers her performance in what is described by Buckley as a "macho, samurai voice", which was done at Bowie's insistence as a way to "break down a particular type of sexist attitude about women". James Perone writes that the track establishes the album's theme of "scary events". The lyrics of "Up the Hill Backwards" deal with the struggle of facing a crisis. Bowie misquotes Thomas Anthony Harris's 1967 self-help book I'm OK – You're OK, a guide on how to save marriage relationships; Carr and Murray see this as a reference to Bowie's divorce from Angie Bowie. Musically, it features unusual time signatures and a Bo Diddley-inspired beat. The title track dated back to a 1975 song titled "Running Scared", which David Bowie originally played to Iggy Pop. The rhythm section took inspiration from Joy Division; Davis's drum performance has been compared to Stephen Morris's on "She's Lost Control" (1979). Described by Perone as punk rock, the music is heavily distorted, featuring Fripp's ferocious guitar-playing, Davis's pounding drums, and Bowie's treated Cockney accent. Lyrically, it follows a claustrophobic relationship between a woman (dating back to Bowie's Berlin days) and a man (the demons inside Bowie).

"Ashes to Ashes" revisits the character of Major Tom from "Space Oddity" (1969). Over ten years later, Major Tom is described as a "junkie", which has been interpreted as parallel to Bowie's own struggles with drug addiction throughout the 1970s. In 1990, Bowie acknowledged "Ashes to Ashes" as a confrontation of his past: "You have to accommodate your pasts within your persona. You have to understand why you went through them... You cannot just ignore them to put them out of your mind or pretend they didn't happen, or just say, 'Oh, I was different then. Musically, "Ashes to Ashes" is built around a guitar synthesiser theme by Hammer, augmented by Clark's synthesiser. Like "Space Oddity" before it, the song was built in stages, and features layers of instruments in its mix. "Fashion" is reminiscent of Bowie's former single "Golden Years", with its mix of funk and reggae. It evolved out of a reggae "spoof" started by Clark on his synthesiser and features guitar "squeals" from Fripp. Apart from being a dance track, the song provokes elements of fascism, with lyrics such as "we are the goon squad" and "turn to the left, turn to the right". The "beep beep" lines were taken from an earlier unreleased song titled "Rupert the Riley".

Side two 

"Teenage Wildlife", the longest track on the album, is structurally similar to "Heroes" but does not feature a refrain; its verses only end with the title being sung over Fripp's guitar breaks. Its backing vocals are reminiscent of the Ronettes, while piano is provided by Roy Bittan. The song's lyrics have been widely interpreted. One interpretation is they are an attack on Bowie imitators who emerged in the late 1970s, such as Gary Numan, who personally believed himself a target. Carr and Murray state that the song is Bowie reflecting on his younger self, while Pegg considers it a confrontation to critics who tried to prevent Bowie from evolving throughout the 1970s. Bowie himself wrote in 2008 that the lyrics are about "taking a short view of life, not looking too far ahead and not predicting the oncoming hard knocks". Although it descends from the early-mid 1970s "I Am a Laser", "Scream Like a Baby" features a contemporary new wave sound with lyrics of instability and political imprisonment, comparable with themes present on The Man Who Sold the World (1970). Bowie recorded his vocal using varispeed, a technique that displays a "split personality" effect.

His first cover on a studio album since Station to Station, "Kingdom Come" is in the same key as Verlaine's original, but is more grand in style. Doggett describes the arrangement as "an unhappy cross between Motown sound and the sterility of American AOR". Lyrically, the song features similar themes to other album tracks, including frustration, boredom and repetition. On release, Bowie dedicated "Because You're Young" to his then nine-year-old son Duncan. Lyrically, the song is similar to other Scary Monsters tracks, featuring Bowie reflecting and advising a younger generation. Townshend's contributions are placed low in the mix. The album ends with "It's No Game (No. 2)", which provides a stark contrast to "No. 1"; it features new lyrics and is more mellow and meditative throughout. Doggett writes that whereas "No. 1" "climaxed with the signals of insanity", "No. 2" "just end[s], draining color from everything around it". Similar to how the album begins, it ends with the sound of a tape rewinding and playing out, although this time, it slows to a halt.

Artwork and packaging 

The cover artwork of Scary Monsters is a large-scale collage by artist Edward Bell featuring Bowie in the Pierrot costume worn in the "Ashes to Ashes" music video, along with photographs taken by photographer Brian Duffy. Duffy was reportedly upset by the final artwork, as he felt the cartoon demeaned his photographs. The original LP's rear sleeve referred to four earlier albums, namely the immediately preceding "Berlin Trilogy" and 1973's Aladdin Sane, the latter also having been designed and photographed by Duffy. The cover images from Low, "Heroes" and Lodger—the last showing Bowie's torso superimposed on the figure from Aladdin Sanes inside gatefold picture—were portrayed in small whitewashed frames to the left of the tracklisting. The lettering used was a reworking of Gerald Scarfe's lettering for Pink Floyd's The Wall, which would be replicated on many album covers in the ensuing years. These images were not reproduced on the Rykodisc reissue in 1992, but were restored for EMI/Virgin's 1999 remastered edition. The original framed album artwork was featured in the David Bowie Is touring museum exhibit.

Release 
The lead single, "Ashes to Ashes", was released in edited form by RCA Records on 1 August 1980, with the Lodger track "Move On" as the B-side. It was issued in three different sleeves, the first 100,000 copies including one of four sets of stamps, all featuring Bowie in the Pierrot outfit he wore in the music video for the song. The song was promoted with a music video, which at £250,000 was the most expensive music video ever made up to that point. Directed by David Mallet, who directed all of Lodgers music videos, the video depicts Bowie in a Pierot costume designed by his former collaborator Natasha Korniloff. The single and video are both regarded by biographers as one of Bowie's finest, with Pegg stating that it kickstarted the New Romantic movement. The single debuted at No. 4 on the UK Singles Chart; after premiering the music video on the BBC television programme Top of the Pops, the single shot to No. 1, becoming Bowie's fastest-selling single and dethroning ABBA's "The Winner Takes It All". It was Bowie's second No. 1 single in the UK, after a reissue of "Space Oddity". However, the US release, featuring "It's No Game (No. 1)" as the B-side, fared worse, peaking at No. 79 on the Cash Box Top 100 chart and No. 101 on the Billboard Bubbling Under the Hot 100 chart.

RCA issued Scary Monsters on 12 September 1980, with the catalogue number RCA BOW LP 2. It was promoted by RCA with the promo line "Often Copied, Never Equalled", seen as a direct reference to the new wave acts Bowie had inspired over the years. The album was a major commercial success, peaking at No. 1 on the UK Albums Chart, his first since Diamond Dogs (1974), and remained on the chart for 32 weeks, his longest since Aladdin Sane (1973). The album restored Bowie's commercial standing in the US, peaking at No. 12 on the Billboard Top LPs & Tape chart and remained on the chart for 27 weeks. Buckley writes that with Scary Monsters, Bowie achieved "the perfect balance" of creativity and mainstream success.

The second single, "Fashion", was released in edited form on 24 October 1980, with "Scream Like a Baby" as the B-side. The single was another commercial success, peaking at No. 5 in the UK and No. 70 in the US. Like the first single, it was promoted by a music video again directed by Mallet. The video depicts Bowie and his backing musicians as "gum-chewing tough guys", interspersed with shots of dancers rehearsing and New Romantic followers. Like "Ashes to Ashes", the video was highly praised, with Record Mirror voting both as the best music videos of 1980. The title track was released as the third single, again in edited form, on 2 January 1981, backed by "Because You're Young". The single continued Bowie's commercial success in the UK, peaking at No. 20. The fourth and final single, "Up the Hill Backwards", was released in March 1981, with the non-album Japanese single "Crystal Japan" as the B-side. It peaked at No. 32 in the UK, performing the worst out of all the singles.

Critical reception 

Scary Monsters received universal praise from music critics. Record Mirror awarded it a rating of seven stars out of five; the same publication voted Bowie the best male singer of 1980, as did the Daily Mirror. Melody Maker called it "an eerily impressive stride into the '80s", while Billboard correctly predicted that it "should be the most accessible and commercially successful Bowie LP in years". The Guardian Robin Denselow agreed, describing Scary Monsters as being "full of accessible, highly original melodies that are increasingly inaccessible".

Debra Rae Cohen of Rolling Stone found the record to be a "clarification" of Bowie's collaborations with Eno and similar in vein to Aladdin Sane, further finding Bowie "settling old scores" throughout Scary Monsters. Fellow critic Dave Marsh considered it one of Bowie's best, saying "if this is the new art-rock, I'm for it." The New York Daily Newss Clint Roswell likewise hailed the record as Bowie's best in years, naming "Ashes to Ashes", "Fashion", "Because You're Young" and the title track as songs that recognise the artist as "the preminent figure in pop". Adding further praise was James Johnson of the Evening Standard, who described the "remarkable" LP as one of the year's best and "proves that Bowie can still maintain his mastery of the rock mainstream whenever he feels like it".

The Boston Globes Jim Sullivan found side two weaker than the first, but concluded "Bowie continues to present a complex, invigorating challenge". Tom Sowa was more mild in The Spokesman-Review. He hailed Scary Monsters as Bowie's finest in four years, highlighting Fripp's contributions and signalled out "Ashes to Ashes" and "Because You're Young", but panned "Teenage Wildlife" as "an overheated, confused and totally embarrassing four minutes of plastic". Murray gave the album a more mixed assessment in NME, stating: "Scary Monsters is shorn of all hope, yet it represents a call to arms. It is an album which presupposes defeat, yet it is unashamedly and unequivocally confrontational." He further called it the "realist's" Bowie record. In The New York Times, John Rockwell felt the album lacked appeal for all rock listeners due to it being "too misshapenly ugly. grindingly abrasive and proudly self-withholding. Nevertheless, he deemed it a "fine record of its particular type". Record Mirror named it the year's second best album, behind Sound Affects by the Jam, while NME ranked it the ninth best album of the year.

Subsequent events 
In February 1980, during the sessions for Scary Monsters, Bowie was approached by Jack Hofsiss, the director of the Broadway play The Elephant Man, to star in the lead role of Joseph "John" Merrick, a severely deformed English man who was rescued from a freak show by the surgeon Frederick Treves in 1880s Victorian England. Hofsiss saw Bowie in The Man Who Fell to Earth (1976) and believed his presence would fit the role. Bowie accepted the role in June 1980 and researched Merrick extensively in preparation. He portrayed Merrick through miming rather than the use of make-up. The play premiered in Denver, Colorado and ran from July 1980 to January 1981, with Bowie receiving immense praise for his performance. Bowie pursued other projects throughout the play's run, including filming an appearance in the Uli Edel film Christiane F. (1981) and film the music video for "Fashion" in October.

On 8 December 1980, Bowie's old friend John Lennon, with whom he worked with on Young Americans (1975), was murdered outside his apartment building in New York. It was later discovered that his murderer, Mark David Chapman, had attended an earlier performance of The Elephant Man, and even considered Bowie a target. Lennon's death had a major impact on Bowie, who declined to renew his contract for the play past early January and cancelled plans to promote Scary Monsters on a concert tour in 1981. Afterwards, Bowie withdrew to his home in Switzerland and became a recluse. Nevertheless, Bowie continued working; in July 1981, he collaborated with Giorgio Moroder for the title song of the Paul Schrader film Cat People (1982). In the same session, he recorded "Under Pressure" with the rock band Queen. He later began rehearsals to perform the title role in a BBC adaptation of Bertolt Brecht's play Baal, directed by Alan Clarke. The play was recorded in August 1981 and transmitted in March 1982. Bowie also recorded a soundtrack EP for the play, which was released by RCA in February 1982 to coincide with the transmission. Upon its premiere, Baal was well-received, with Bowie's performance being singled out. During 1982, Bowie also filmed appearances in The Hunger and Merry Christmas, Mr. Lawrence, both released in 1983.

Bowie would not release another studio album until 1983's Let's Dance. Scary Monsters was also Bowie's final studio album for RCA Records, who had been his label since Hunky Dory (1971). Bowie had grown increasingly dissatisfied with the label, who he felt was "milking" his back catalogue. Bowie was also eager for the expiration of his 1975 severance settlement with his old manager Tony Defries, which was due to expire in September 1982. Although RCA was willing to re-sign, Bowie signed a new contract with EMI America Records, and with Let's Dance, began an era of major commercial success.

Influence and legacy 

Retrospectively, Scary Monsters continues to receive acclaim. Jon Dolan of Spin wrote that although the 1980s were a less-than-stellar decade for the artist creatively, he began the decade strong with Scary Monsters, praising Bowie's vocal performance and describing "Ashes to Ashes" in particular as "gorgeous". Erlewine praised the album for its culmination of Bowie's 1970s works: "While the music isn't far removed from the post-punk of the early '80s, it does sound fresh, hip, and contemporary, which is something Bowie lost over the course of the '80s." Eduardo Rivadavia praised the record's "risk-taking creativity" in Ultimate Classic Rock, writing that the artist's decision to take time writing lyrics resulted in some of the best lyrics and vocal performances of his career. He ultimately called the album one of Bowie's "very best career efforts." Author Peter Doggett describes Scary Monsters as one of Bowie's "most valuable statements", writing that it "annull[ed] audience expectations" and launched a "warning for those who might dare to follow in his footsteps."

Reviewing the album's remaster for the 2017 box set A New Career in a New Town (1977–1982), Chris Gerard of PopMatters highlighted Bowie's vocal performance on the record as among his best, further complimenting the songs' arrangements and harmonies as "jaw-droppingly brilliant as anything you'll find in the realm of rock 'n' roll." Analysing the album for its 40th anniversary in 2020, Stereogums Ryan Leas described Scary Monsters as "the less-heralded classic of Bowie's career", complimenting the way Bowie was able to mesh the different eras of his career up to that point into a creative whole. Leas concluded: "[Scary Monsters] was the album that best-captured everything Bowie was about — and it will always be the conduit through which everything travelled, all of his old selves folded in and carried forward through the rest of his life. In a 2013 readers' poll for Rolling Stone, Scary Monsters was voted Bowie's seventh greatest album. The magazine argued that it would be his final "satisfying from start to finish" album.

Reflecting on the critical and commercial success of Scary Monsters, Visconti stated, "We kind of felt that we'd finally achieved our Sgt. Pepper, a goal we had in mind since The Man Who Sold the World." Visconti further said: "It is one of my favourite Bowie albums ever." Despite his glowing assessment of the album, Scary Monsters proved to be the final collaboration between Bowie and Visconti for over 20 years, after Bowie chose Nile Rodgers to produce Let's Dance. Although Bowie would achieve worldwide mega-stardom and commercial success in the following years, in particular with Let's Dance, many commentators consider Scary Monsters to be "his last great album" and the "benchmark" for each new release. Well-regarded later efforts such as Outside (1995), Earthling (1997), Heathen (2002) and Reality (2003) were cited as "the best album since Scary Monsters." Buckley suggested that "Bowie should pre-emptively sticker up his next album 'Best Since Scary Monsters and have done with it". Biographer Marc Spitz considers it more accurate to call the album Bowie's "last 'young' record", in that it was his final "perfectly confident statement" and the final time that Bowie's "search for the 'new' in our world of sound [felt] pure, as opposed to betraying itself".

Bowie's biographers continue to praise Scary Monsters. Pegg writes that retrospectively, Scary Monsters sounds "as fresh and dynamic as ever", and ended "Bowie's golden run of cutting-edge albums." O'Leary described it in 2019 as Bowie's most "modern"-sounding album. Spitz finds the record to have an energy that his later "good" albums don't (naming Outside and Heathen). Doggett considers it as one of Bowie's "most valuable statements", exceeding his listeners' expectations while at the same time sending a warning out to anyone who dared to follow in his footsteps. Sandford states that with Scary Monsters, Bowie "found his voice again" after years of experimentation. Perone praises the album as "a near-perfect balance of [Bowie's] pop and experimental sides" and that it remains one of the artist's "most important and consistent albums". In 2011, Paul Trynka wrote: "Scary Monsters still sparkles today. Its intense, churning grooves sound remarkably contemporary... but despite the complexity of its arrangements there are many moments of unaffected simplicity." He considers the album's "dense, tough, rock-meets-funk backup" as influential on later bands such as Blur and the Strokes.

Rankings 
Scary Monsters has appeared on several lists of the greatest albums of all time by multiple publications. In 2000, Q ranked Scary Monsters at number 30 on its list of the "100 Greatest British Albums Ever". In 2002, Pitchfork placed it at number 93 on its list of the top 100 albums of the 1980s. In 2012, Slant Magazine listed the album at number 27 on its list of the 100 best albums of the 1980s, saying "Bowie bridles the experimentation of his Berlin trilogy and channels those synth flourishes and off-kilter guitar licks into one of the decade's quirkiest pop albums." In 2013, NME ranked the album at number 381 on its list of the 500 greatest albums of all time. In 2018, Pitchfork placed it at number 53 on its revised list of the 200 best albums of the 1980s. In 2020, Rolling Stone placed it at number 443 on its revision of the 500 greatest albums of all time.

Reissues 
The album has been rereleased five times to date on compact disc. It was first released on CD by RCA Records in the mid-1980s. A second CD release, in 1992 by Rykodisc and EMI, contained four bonus tracks. A 1999 CD release by EMI/Virgin, with no bonus tracks, featured 24-bit digitally-remastered sound. The album was re-released in 2003 by EMI as a Super Audio CD, again with no bonus tracks. In 2017, the album was remastered for the A New Career in a New Town (1977–1982) box set released by Parlophone. It was released in CD, vinyl, and digital formats, both as part of this compilation and then separately the following year.

Track listing 
All songs written by David Bowie, except where noted.

Personnel 
Albums credits per the liner notes and biographer Nicholas Pegg.
David Bowie vocals, synthesisers, mellotron, electric piano, piano, synth-bass, sound effects, backing vocals, saxophone
Dennis Davis drums
George Murray bass
Carlos Alomar lead and rhythm guitars
Chuck Hammer guitar synthesiser 
Robert Fripp guitar 
Roy Bittan piano 
Andy Clark synthesiser 
Pete Townshend guitar 
Tony Visconti acoustic guitar , backing vocals
Lynn Maitland backing vocals
Chris Porter backing vocals
Michi Hirota voice 

Production
David Bowie, Tony Visconti production and engineering
Larry Alexander, Jeff Hendrickson engineering assistance
Peter Mew, Nigel Reeve mastering

Charts and certifications

Weekly charts

Year-end charts

Certifications

Notes

References

Sources

External links 

David Bowie albums
Albums produced by Tony Visconti
1980 albums
Albums produced by David Bowie
EMI Records albums
RCA Records albums
Rykodisc albums
Virgin Records albums
Parlophone albums
New wave albums by English artists
Art rock albums by English artists